Eva Ramón Gallegos is a Mexican scientist, professor and researcher at the  Escuela Nacional de Ciencias Biológicas of the Instituto Politécnico Nacional. Her field of specialty is in biomedical sciences and nanobiotechnology. Her main line of research is the search for non-invasive treatments for the eradication of the uterine cervical cancer produced by the human papilloma virus (HPV), using photodynamic therapies.

Biography 
Together with the researcher Elizabeth Maldonado, and after 20 years of research, Eva Ramón Gallegos developed a method by which, in an economical and efficient way, the human papillomavirus could be detected in women. The technique has a precision of 98 percent and is based on the analysis of the roughness of the skin and the modifications that occur when there are benign, premalignant, and malignant lesions.  The results of the research were published in 2005 in the journal Physics in Medicine and Biology.
In 2017, Gallegos was part of a team that was determining the effectiveness of photodynamic therapy in eliminating HPV-16 and HPV-18.

Publications 

 Roblero-Bartolón GV & Ramón-Gallegos E. 2015. Uso de nanopartículas (NP) en la terapia fotodinámica (photodynamic therapy [PDT]) contra el cáncer. Gac Med Mex. 151: 85-98. .
 Bermeo-Escalona JR, González-López BS, Ramón-Gallegos E& H Mendieta-Zeron. 2014. Effectiveness of Toki's criteria and determination of variables for identification of HPV L1 protein in oral lesions. Med Oral Patol Oral Cir Bucal. 19 (6): e538-44. . .
 Muñoz-Cadena CE, Lina-Manjarrez P, Estrada-Izquierdo I & Ramón-Gallegos E. 2012. An approach to litter generation and littering practices in a Mexico City neighborhood. Sustainability. 4 (8): 1733-1754. . .

Awards 

 Biennial Award of the Fundación Mexicana para la Salud  for the publication of Implementación y análisis de patrones de relieve de la superficie de lesiones benignas y malignas de la piel por microtopografía.
 Medal of Merit ALDF in the field of Science and Technology of the Federal District 2012.

References 

Women biologists
Mexican women scientists
Year of birth missing (living people)
Living people